Al Nahda is a rapid transit station on the Green Line of the Dubai Metro in Dubai, UAE, serving the Al Qusais and Al Twar areas in Deira. The district of Al Nahda itself is around 3/4 mile away.

The station opened as part of the Green Line on 9 September 2011. It is close to the Adab Iranian Private School, Al Kuwait Intermediate Girls School, the Ministry of Energy and Infrastructure, The Westminster School, and the Al Bustan Centre. The station is also close to a number of bus routes.

References

Railway stations in the United Arab Emirates opened in 2011
Dubai Metro stations